Nestori is the given name of the following people:
Nestori Aronen (1876–1954), Finnish politician
Nestori Järvelä (1893–1951), Finnish middle-distance runner
Nestori Kaasalainen (1915–2016), Finnish politician
Nestori Lähde (born 1989), Finnish ice hockey player
Nestori Toivonen (1865–1927), Finnish sport shooter

See also
Nestor (disambiguation)

Finnish masculine given names